In shogi, Reclining Silver (腰掛け銀 koshikakegin) is a piece formation used in different Double Static Rook openings. It may also be played in Double Ranging Rook openings as well and in Right Fourth File Rook (Static Rook) positions against Ranging Rook positions.

The Reclining Silver has the right silver positioned on central file above the central pawn and to the right of the silver is the pawn that was advancing in order to let the silver move through the line of pawns. The silver is said to recline on the seat of pawns.

In the adjacent board diagram, both Black and White have created Reclining Silver positions. Black has their silver on 56 (with pawns on 46 and 57) while White has their silver on 54 (pawns on 53, 64).

Reclining Silver can often played as a component of several different Static Rook openings such as Double Wing or Bishop Exchange.

Clanging Silvers

Clanging Silvers (ガッチャン銀 gatchan gin) is an attacking development from a Double Reclining Silver position.

In this case, a player advances their silver that is in the Reclining Silver formation such that it attacks their opponent's reclined silver and offers a silver trade.

See also

 Bishop Exchange Reclining Silver
 Double Wing Attack Floating Rook § Reclining Silver
 Static Rook

Bibliography

 
 
 
 

Shogi openings
Static Rook openings